The South River is a tributary of the Raritan River in central New Jersey in the United States.

The South River, formed by the confluence of Matchaponix Brook and Manalapan Brook, becomes tidal downstream of the Duhernal Lake dam and joins the Raritan River approximately midway between New Brunswick and Perth Amboy.

The community of Old Bridge in East Brunswick was established in the 17th century at the head of navigation of the river.

The South River has two mouths. It used to loop inefficiently to its confluence with the Raritan River, so a shortcut called Washington Canal was created.

The river lends its name to the borough of South River.

Tributaries
Deep Run
Duck Creek
 Manalapan Brook
 Matchaponix Brook
Pond Creek
Tennents Brook

See also
List of rivers of New Jersey

References

Tributaries of the Raritan River
Rivers of New Jersey
Rivers of Middlesex County, New Jersey
South River, New Jersey